The eighth series of the British medical drama television series Casualty commenced airing in the United Kingdom on BBC One on 18 September 1993 and finished on 26 February 1994.

Cast

Overview
The eighth series of Casualty features a cast of characters working in the emergency department of Holby City Hospital. The series began with 7 roles with star billing. Clive Mantle starred as emergency medicine consultant Mike Barratt. Derek Thompson continued his role as charge nurse Charlie Fairhead. Cathy Shipton and Patrick Robinson appeared as staff nurses Lisa "Duffy" Duffin and Martin "Ash" Ashford. Ian Bleasdale portrayed paramedic Josh Griffiths while Caroline Webster starred as paramedic and later, general manager Jane Scott. Anne Kristen continued to appear as receptionist Norma Sullivan. Jo Unwin appeared in two episodes as paramedic Lucy Cooper, before joining the recurring cast in episode twenty. Brian Miller appeared in two episodes as Norma's husband, Chris Sullivan. David Ryall also appeared in four episodes as locum emergency medicine consultant Tom Harley.

This series saw several new cast members join the series. Oliver Parker, Suzanna Hamilton, Doña Croll and Christopher Guard were introduced in the first episode as surgical manager Mark Calder, senior house officer Karen Goodliffe, staff nurse Adele Beckford and clinical nurse specialist Ken Hodges. Parker departed in episode eighteen; Hamilton left in episode seventeen; Croll departed at the conclusion of the series; and Guard left in episode seven. Samantha Edwards, Naoko Mori and Steven O'Donnell joined the cast in the second episode as project 2000 nurse Helen Chatsworth, receptionist Mie Nishi-Kawa and porter Frankie Drummer. Edwards left the series in episode ten and Mori and O'Donnell departed in episode twenty-four. Brendan O'Hea first appeared in episode nine as paramedic Brian Crawford. He departed in episode nineteen. Tara Moran was introduced in episode twelve as trainee staff nurse Mary Skillett and departed at the conclusion of the series. Martin Ball joined the cast in episode fifteen as senior house officer Dave Masters and departed in episode twenty-four. Jane Gurnett made her debut in episode sixteen as staff nurse Rachel Longworth. 

William Gaminara reprised his role as Andrew Bower in episodes nine and eleven, now appearing as Duffy's husband. Kristen departed the series in episode five and Webster departed at the conclusion of the series. Shipton, who had appeared on the show since its creation, chose to leave the show and departed in episode thirteen.

Main characters 
Martin Ball as Dave Masters (episodes 15−24)
Ian Bleasdale as Josh Griffiths
Doña Croll as Adele Beckford (episodes 1−24)
Samantha Edwards as Helen Chatsworth (episodes 2−10)
Christopher Guard as Ken Hodges (episodes 1−7)
Jane Gurnett as Rachel Longworth (from episode 16)
Suzanna Hamilton as Karen Goodliffe (episodes 1−17)
Anne Kristen as Norma Sullivan (until episode 5)
Clive Mantle as Mike Barratt
Tara Moran as Mary Skillett (episodes 12−24)
Naoko Mori as Mie Nishi-Kawa (episodes 2−24)
Steven O'Donnell as Frankie Drummer (episodes 2−24)
Brendan O'Hea as Brian Crawford (episodes 9−19)
Oliver Parker as Mark Calder (episodes 1−18)
Patrick Robinson as Martin "Ash" Ashford
Cathy Shipton as Lisa "Duffy" Duffin (until episode 13)
Derek Thompson as Charlie Fairhead
Caroline Webster as Jane Scott (until episode 24)

Recurring and guest characters 
William Gaminara as Andrew Bower (episodes 9 and 11)
Brian Miller as Chris Sullivan (episodes 3 and 6)
David Ryall as Tom Harley (episodes 10−13)
Jo Unwin as Lucy Cooper (episodes 1, 15, 20−24)

Episodes

References

External links
 Casualty series 8 at the Internet Movie Database

08
1993 British television seasons
1994 British television seasons